Sprung Monkey is an American band that originated in San Diego, California, United States, initially active from 1991 to 2002, and again since 2005. Sprung Monkey consisted of five members, Steve Summers (vocals), Mike Summers and William Riley (guitars), Ernie Longoria (drums), and Ryan Flores (bass guitar).

The band achieved mainstream success with their anthem "Get 'Em Outta Here" from their third album, Mr. Funnyface, later featured in the film 10 Things I Hate About You. This success resulted in supporting The Offspring on the Americana tour. Around this time, they were also featured during a segment in the Standard Films snowboard movie TB8 Infinity. They have been included in all three volumes of Music for Our Mother Ocean.

The Sprung Monkey song, "So Cal Loco (Party Like a Rockstar)" appears in the credits of the film Dude, Where's My Car? Also, "Beautiful" was featured in the films Kart Racer and Bookies.

Another song, "Get a Taste", was featured in the movie Van Wilder during two scenes.

A third song, "Super Breakdown", was a registered song in the 1999 action sports film, Gravity Games: Bikes.

The band itself made a guest appearance on Buffy the Vampire Slayer's first episode, "Welcome to the Hellmouth", performing the song "Believe".  The songs "Saturated", "Swirl" and  "Things Are Changing" are also heard in that episode.  In addition, the song "Right My Wrong" is heard in "The Harvest", and "Reluctant Man" is heard in "The Pack".

The song "American Made" was included in an episode of Smallville.

The songs "Bleeding", "Mi Mundo es Muerto" and "Man in a Striped Shirt" are included on the soundtrack of Taylor Steele's 1992 surf movie, Momentum.

The songs "Remember", "People", "Love is Dead" and "Stay Down" are featured on the soundtrack of Taylor Steele's 1993 surf movie titled Momentum II.

Discography
Studio albums
Situation Life (1993)
Swirl (1995)
Mr. Funny Face (1998)
Get A Taste (2001)
Dead is Dead (2013)

Singles

Timeline

References

Musical groups established in 1991
Musical groups disestablished in 2002
Musical groups from San Diego
Musical groups reestablished in 2005
1991 establishments in California
Alternative rock groups from California
Hard rock musical groups from California
Punk rock groups from California